FK Marena is a football club based in the village of Marena, near Kavadarci, Republic of Macedonia. They are currently competing in the Macedonian Third League (South Division).

History 
The club was founded in 1990.

References

External links
Marena Facebook 
Club info at MacedonianFootball 
Football Federation of Macedonia 

Marena
Association football clubs established in 1990
1990 establishments in the Socialist Republic of Macedonia
FK